Septoria ostryae is a fungal plant pathogen infecting hazelnut.

References

External links
 Index Fungorum
 USDA ARS Fungal Database

ostryae
Fungal tree pathogens and diseases
Hazelnut tree diseases
Fungi described in 1883